John Lewis (January 17, 1858 – May 18, 1935) was a Canadian author and journalist who was, variously, editor of the Toronto Daily Star and the Toronto Globe and served in the Senate of Canada for the last ten years of his life.

Lewis' father, John, was a Welshman who immigrated to Canada and worked as a teacher and school principal. Lewis himself was born on Bay Street in Toronto, Ontario, a few yards from the future site of Toronto's Old City Hall. After attending Dufferin Public School, where his father was the first principal, and Toronto High School (now Jarvis Collegiate), he worked in a law office for a few years before getting a job with The Toronto World in 1881 and then worked for the Mail and Empire and the Winnipeg Tribune before returning to Toronto in 1883 and worked for the Globe for 19 years. During this time he worked in the press gallery in Ottawa for two years before taking on editorial duties at the paper. He also wrote a biography of Globe founder George Brown. From 1902 to 1905 he worked as an editor at The News and the Mail and Empire. He then worked for the Daily Star as editor from 1905 until 1919.

Lewis covered stories as far ranging as the North-West Rebellion, the Golden Jubilee of Queen Victoria and numerous election campaigns.

From 1920 to 1921, Lewis worked for the National Liberal Committee in the lead up to the 1921 federal election, editing the party's political literature and writing a biography of party leader William Lyon Mackenzie King. After the campaign, he returned to the Globe, this time as the newspaper's editor.

In 1925, Mackenzie King, now Prime Minister, appointed Lewis to the Senate where he sat as a Liberal representative until his death.

His books include The Life of George Brown and the political history Canada and its Provinces.

References

External links
 
 
 

1858 births
1935 deaths
Canadian biographers
Male biographers
Canadian newspaper journalists
Canadian male journalists
Canadian newspaper editors
Canadian senators from Ontario
Journalists from Toronto
Liberal Party of Canada senators
20th-century Canadian historians
Canadian male non-fiction writers
Canadian people of Welsh descent
People from Old Toronto
Politicians from Toronto
Writers from Toronto